Huang Xinting (October 4, 1913 – May 12, 2006) was a People's Liberation Army lieutenant general. He was born in what is now part of Honghu in Hubei Province. He died in Beijing. He was a member of the 12th Central Committee of the Communist Party of China and a delegate to the 3rd National People's Congress.

1913 births
2006 deaths
People's Liberation Army generals from Hubei
Members of the 12th Central Committee of the Chinese Communist Party
Delegates to the 3rd National People's Congress